Roger Federer defeated Mark Philippoussis in the final, 7–6(7–5), 6–2, 7–6(7–3) to win the gentlemen's singles tennis title at the 2003 Wimbledon Championships. It was his first major title, the first of a record eight gentlemen's singles titles at Wimbledon, and the first of 20 major men's singles titles overall.

Lleyton Hewitt was the defending champion, but was defeated in the first round by Ivo Karlović. As a result, Hewitt became one of only two defending Wimbledon men's singles champions to lose in the first round of their defence, the other being Manuel Santana in 1967. As per tradition, the defending champion Hewitt was playing the opening match on Centre Court – a situation he had willingly avoided the previous year (when the defending champion Goran Ivanišević withdrew) out of fear of the unpredictability of fresh grass.

With the losses of Hewitt, Andre Agassi and Juan Carlos Ferrero in the fourth round, a first-time major champion was guaranteed. This marked the first time in the Open Era that none of the quarterfinalists in a major had previously won a major singles title.

This tournament marked the major main draw debut of future 22-time major champion and world No. 1 Rafael Nadal (who was also the youngest player in the draw); he lost to Paradorn Srichaphan in the third round. It was also notable for the absence of seven-time Wimbledon champion Pete Sampras, who had yet to announce his official retirement following his final match at the 2002 US Open. The 2003 Championships was also the first time that bowing to the Royal Box on Centre Court was no longer required by the players.

Seeds

  Lleyton Hewitt (first round)
  Andre Agassi (fourth round)
  Juan Carlos Ferrero (fourth round)
  Roger Federer (champion)
  Andy Roddick (semifinals)
  David Nalbandian (fourth round)
  Guillermo Coria (first round)
  Sjeng Schalken (quarterfinals)
  Rainer Schüttler (fourth round)
  Tim Henman (quarterfinals)
  Jiří Novák (third round)
  Paradorn Srichaphan (fourth round)
  Sébastien Grosjean (semifinals)
  Xavier Malisse (first round)
  Arnaud Clément (second round)
  Mikhail Youzhny (second round)
  Gustavo Kuerten (second round)
  Marat Safin (withdrew)
  Fernando González (first round)
  Yevgeny Kafelnikov (first round)
  Martin Verkerk (first round)
  Félix Mantilla (first round)
  Agustín Calleri (second round)
  Albert Costa (withdrew)
  Tommy Robredo (third round)
  James Blake (second round)
  Younes El Aynaoui (third round)
  Wayne Ferreira (first round)
  Gastón Gaudio (first round)
  Jarkko Nieminen (third round)
  Vince Spadea (first round)
  Juan Ignacio Chela (second round)
  Nikolay Davydenko (first round)
  Àlex Corretja (withdrew)
  Radek Štěpánek (third round)

Albert Costa and Marat Safin withdrew due to injury. They were replaced in the draw by the highest-ranked non-seeded players Nikolay Davydenko and Àlex Corretja, who became the #33 and #34 seeds respectively. Corretja subsequently withdrew due to personal reasons and was replaced by the next highest non-seeded player Radek Štěpánek, who became the #35 seed.

Qualifying

Draw

Finals

Top half

Section 1

Section 2

Section 3

Section 4

Bottom half

Section 5

Section 6

Section 7

Section 8

References

External links

 2003 Wimbledon Championships – Men's draws and results at the International Tennis Federation

Men's Singles
Wimbledon Championship by year – Men's singles